The FIL European Luge Championships 1978 took place in Hammarstrand, Sweden for the third time after hosting the event previously in 1970 and 1976.

Men's singles

Women's singles

Men's doubles

Czechoslovakia earned their first championship medal since 1939.

Medal table

References
Men's doubles European champions
Men's singles European champions
Women's singles European champions

FIL European Luge Championships
1978 in luge
Luge in Sweden
1978 in Swedish sport